Alexis Lafrenière (born October 11, 2001) is a Canadian professional ice hockey left winger for the New York Rangers of the National Hockey League (NHL). Selected first overall by the Rimouski Océanic of the Quebec Major Junior Hockey League (QMJHL) in 2017, he was awarded the QMJHL Rookie of the Year award and was named to the First All-Star team in his rookie season. He was selected first overall by the Rangers in the 2020 NHL Entry Draft and made his NHL debut with the team in 2021.

Lafrenière has represented Canada internationally at the 2018 IIHF World U18 Championships, 2018 Hlinka Gretzky Cup, 2019 World Junior Ice Hockey Championships, and the 2020 World Junior Ice Hockey Championships. As the captain of the Canadian national junior team, Lafrenière led them to a gold medal at the Hlinka Gretzky Cup.

Playing career

QMJHL

Lafrenière was selected first overall in the 2017 QMJHL entry draft by Rimouski Océanic. In his rookie season, he scored 42 goals, the most goals scored by a rookie since Sidney Crosby in 2004. He was awarded the RDS Cup as QMJHL rookie of the year and was named to the First All-Star team.

NHL
Following the shortened 2019–20 QMJHL season, Lafrenière was considered the consensus first overall pick for the 2020 NHL Entry Draft having led the league in scoring with 112 points. He was eventually drafted first overall by the New York Rangers on October 6, 2020, becoming their first-ever first overall pick in the entry draft era. On October 12, Lafrenière signed an entry-level contract with the Rangers. 

On January 14, 2021, Lafrenière made his NHL debut with the New York Rangers, logging one shot on goal in the 4–0 loss to the New York Islanders. On January 28, 2021, Lafrenière scored his first NHL goal in a 3–2 overtime win against the Buffalo Sabres. He became the first Ranger to score his first career NHL goal in overtime since Mats Zuccarello did on January 5, 2011. Lafrenière also became the youngest player in NHL history to score their first career goal in overtime (19 years, 109 days old). The only other teenage player to do that was Cody Ceci (also 19) in 2013.
 	
On May 7, 2022, Lafrenière scored his first career playoff goal during the Game 4 of the Stanley Cup playoffs against the Pittsburgh Penguins. At 20 years and 208 days, he became the youngest Ranger with a playoff point since Steven Rice (19 years, 322 days) in 1991.

International play

 

Lafrenière was the youngest player selected for Team Canada's U18 team at the 2018 IIHF World U18 Championships at the age of 16. He later captained Team Canada at the 2018 Hlinka Gretzky Cup tournament, despite being the second youngest on the roster. Lafreniere led the tournament with 11 points in five games, helping Canada win gold.

In December 2018, Lafrenière was named to Team Canada's 2019 IIHF World Junior Championship roster. He was the youngest member on the roster and the ninth-youngest forward ever to represent Canada in the World Juniors. He scored his first, and only, goal of the tournament during Canada's 5–1 win over the Czech Republic. Canada was later eliminated by Team Finland in the quarterfinals.

In December 2019, he was named to Team Canada's 2020 World Junior Ice Hockey Championships roster. After a four-point performance in the team's 6–4 win against the United States in the tournament opener, Lafrenière suffered a lower-body injury the following game after colliding with Russian goaltender Amir Miftakhov on a scoring chance in the second period. He would miss two games, and came back strong, helping lead Canada to a gold medal. He was named one of the three best players on Team Canada, tournament MVP, and was named to the media all star team. He registered four goals and six assists for 10 points in five games.

Personal life
Lafrenière was raised in Saint-Eustache, Quebec, the son of Hugo and Nathalie Lafrenière, a first grade teacher. He has one sister, Lori-Jane, who is three years older than him and plays soccer at the Université de Montréal. Alexis was also a talented baseball shortstop in his youth before deciding to focus on hockey. Despite being a Montreal Canadiens fan growing up, Lafrenière's favorite player is Patrick Kane.

Career statistics

Regular season and playoffs

International

Awards and honours

References

External links

 

2001 births
Living people
Canadian expatriate ice hockey players in the United States
Canadian ice hockey left wingers
French Quebecers
Ice hockey people from Quebec
National Hockey League first-overall draft picks
National Hockey League first-round draft picks
New York Rangers draft picks
New York Rangers players
People from Saint-Eustache, Quebec
Rimouski Océanic players